Theodor Eyrich (29 May 1893 – 9 October 1979) was a Danish rower. He competed at the 1912 Summer Olympics and the 1920 Summer Olympics.

References

External links
 

1893 births
1979 deaths
Danish male rowers
Olympic rowers of Denmark
Rowers at the 1912 Summer Olympics
Rowers at the 1920 Summer Olympics
Rowers from Copenhagen